Karl Johannes Terras (9 September 1890 Vaivara Parish (now part of Narva-Jõesuu), Kreis Wierland – 25 February 1942 Kirov Oblast) was an Estonian politician. He was a member of VI Riigikogu (its National Council).

In 1916 he graduated St. Petersburg University in law speciality.

1920–1940 he was State Secretary of Estonia. 

He was also active in Estonian sport life. Between 1934–1940, he was the chairman of Estonian Sport Central Union.

References

1890 births
1942 deaths
People from Narva-Jõesuu
People from Kreis Wierland
Members of the Riiginõukogu
20th-century Estonian lawyers
Saint Petersburg State University alumni
Russian military personnel of World War I
Recipients of the Military Order of the Cross of the Eagle, Class I
Recipients of the Military Order of the Cross of the Eagle, Class V
Estonian people executed by the Soviet Union
People who died in the Gulag